Plectrodes is a genus of May beetles and junebugs in the family Scarabaeidae. There is one described species, P. pubescens.

References

Further reading

 
 
 
 
 

Melolonthinae
Monotypic Scarabaeidae genera
Articles created by Qbugbot